Sir John Friend or Freind (died 1696), was an English conspirator.

Life
Friend was the eldest son of John Friend, a brewer, who resided in the precinct of St. Katharine's, near the Tower of London. He followed his father's business. He built the "stately brewhouse" called the Phœnix in the Minories, and amassed considerable wealth. For a while he maintained a fine country residence at Hackney.

In 1683 Friend was appointed a commissioner of excise. As Colonel of the Honourable Artillery Company (HAC), Friend, on occasion of their feast, 26 June 1684, had the honour of entertaining James, Duke of York and Prince George of Denmark at a banquet in the Artillery Ground. Though a Protestant, he remained a faithful adherent of James II, by whom he was knighted 3 August 1685.

After the Glorious Revolution Friend was expelled from the HAC at a meeting held in February 1689–90, and lost his seat at the board of excise. However, by a treasury order dated 18 December 1690, he was relieved from the payment of excise duties. James sent him a colonel's commission to raise a regiment of horse against event of the French invading in Kent; but, observes Burnet, 'his purse was more considered than his head, and was open on all occasions as the party applied to him'. He refused, however, to take any share in the assassination plot against William III, although he kept the secret.

On the discovery of the conspiracy he was arraigned for high treason at the Old Bailey, 23 March 1696, and was denied the assistance of counsel by Chief-justice Sir John Holt. The Treason Act 1695 which allowed counsel in cases of treason came into operation two days later. Friend was convicted and sentenced to death. He protested that the witnesses against him "were Papists, and not to be believed against Protestants". He refused to betray his confederates to a committee of the House of Commons of England.

Together with Sir William Parkyns, Friend was executed at Tyburn 3 April 1696. They received absolution at the scaffold from three nonjuring clergymen. Friend's remains were barbarously set up at Temple Bar, 'a dismal sight,’ says Evelyn, 'which many pitied'. Aylmer, the bookseller, for printing Friend's trial, 'wherein his lordship (i.e. Holt) is misrepresented,’ was arrested by order of Holt in May.

Friend was twice married. According to Le Neve, "Mr. Gibbon, John, write a little pamphlet called the whole life & conversation of Sr Jo. friend." The name is spelt either "Freind" or "Friend".

References

Year of birth missing
1696 deaths
17th-century births
English knights
People executed at Tyburn
17th-century Protestants
People from Hackney Central
People executed under the Stuarts for treason against England
Executed people from London